Albania Today was an English language daily newspaper published in Albania. The paper was established in 1996.

References

Defunct newspapers published in Albania
English-language newspapers published in Europe
1996 establishments in Albania